Paricalcitol (chemically it is 19-nor-1,25-(OH)2-vitamin D2. Marketed by Abbott Laboratories under the trade name Zemplar) is a drug used for the prevention and treatment of secondary hyperparathyroidism (excessive secretion of parathyroid hormone) associated with chronic kidney failure. It is an analog of 1,25-dihydroxyergocalciferol, the active form of vitamin D2 (ergocalciferol).

It was patented in 1989 and approved for medical use in 1998.

Medical uses
Its primary use in medicine is in the treatment of secondary hyperparathyroidism associated with chronic kidney disease. However current evidence is not sufficient to demonstrate an advantage of paricalcitol over non-selective vitamin D derivatives for this indication.

Adverse effects
Adverse effects by frequency:
Very common (>10% frequency):
 Nausea

Common (1-10% frequency):

 Diarrhoea†
 Oedema
 Allergic reaction
 Arthritis
 Dizziness†
 Stomach discomfort‡
 Gastroesophageal reflux disease†
 Acne†
 Hypercalcaemia†
 Hypocalcaemia†
 Hyperphosphataemia
 Decreased appetite†
 Headache
 Breast tenderness†
 Taste changes
 Hypoparathyroidism
 Vertigo
 Rash‡

Uncommon (0.1-1% frequency):

 Abnormal hepatic enzymes‡
 Constipation‡
 Dry mouth‡
 Itchiness‡
 Hives
 Hypersensitivity‡
 Muscle spasms‡
 Bleeding time prolonged
 Aspartate aminotransferase increased
 Laboratory test abnormal
 Weight loss
 Elevated blood creatinine
 Cardiac arrest
 Arrhythmia
 Atrial flutter
 Anaemia
 Leucopenia
 Lymphadenopathy
 Coma
 Stroke
 Transient ischemic attack
 Fainting
 Myoclonus
 Hypoaesthesia
 Paraesthesia
 Glaucoma
 Conjunctivitis
 Ear disorder
 Pulmonary oedema
 Asthma
 Shortness of breath
 Nose bleed
 Cough
 Rectal haemhorrhage
 Colitis
 Gastritis
 Indigestion
 Difficulty swallowing
 Gastrointestinal disorder
 Gastrointestinal haemorrhage
 Bullous dermatitis
 Hair loss
 Hirsutism
 Hyperhidrosis
 Joint pain
 Joint stiffness
 Back pain
 Muscle twitching
 Muscle aches
 Hyperparathyroidism
 Hyperkalaemia
 Hypocalcemia
 Breast cancer
 Sepsis
 Pneumonia
 Infection
 Pharyngitis
 Vaginal infection
 Influenza
 High blood pressure
 Hypotension
 Gait disturbance
 Injection site pain
 Fever
 Chest pain
 Condition aggravated
 Muscle weakness
 Malaise
 Thirst
 Breast pain
 Impotence
 Confusional state
 Delirium
 Depersonalization
 Agitation
 Insomnia
 Nervousness

‡ These are adverse effects only seen in patients with grade 3 or 4 chronic kidney disease. 
† These are adverse effects only seen in patients with grade 5 chronic kidney disease.

Contraindications
Contraindications include:
 Vitamin D intoxication
 Hypercalcaemia
 Hypersensitivity to paricalcitol or any of its excipients

whereas cautions include:
 Impaired liver function
 It is also advised that physicians regularly monitor their patients' calcium and phosphorus levels.

Interactions
Drugs that may interact with paricalcitol include: 

 Ketoconazole, as it may interfere with paricalcitol's metabolism in the liver.
 Digitoxin, hypercalcaemia due to any cause can exacerbate the toxicity of digitoxin.
 Thiazide diuretics or calcium supplements as hypercalcaemia may be induced by this combination
 Magnesium-containing products such as antacids may increase the risk of hypermagnesemia.
 Aluminium-containing products such as antacids may increase the risk of aluminium toxicity.
 Drugs that interfere with the absorption of fat-soluble vitamins, such as cholestyramine may interfere with the absorption of paricalcitol.

Overdose
Electrolyte abnormalities (e.g. hypercalcaemia and hyperphosphataemia) are common overdose symptoms. Treatment is mostly supportive, with particular attention being paid to correcting electrolyte anomalies and reducing intake of calcium in both the form of supplementation and diet. As it is so heavily bound to plasma proteins haemodialysis is unlikely to be helpful in cases of overdose.

Early symptoms of overdose can include:

 Weakness
 Headache
 Somnolence
 Nausea
 Vomiting
 Dry mouth
 Constipation
 Muscle pain
 Bone pain
 Metallic taste in the mouth.

It is worth noting, however, that may of these symptoms are also indicative of kidney failure and hence may be masked by the patient's condition.

Late symptoms of overdose include:

 Loss of appetite
 Weight loss
 Conjunctivitis (calcific)
 Pancreatitis
 Photophobia
 Rhinorrhoea
 Pruritus
 Hyperthermia
 Decreased libido
 Elevated BUN
 Hypercholesterolaemia
 Elevated AST and ALT
 Ectopic calcification
 Hypertension
 Cardiac arrhythmias
 Somnolence
 Death
 Psychosis (rare)

Mechanism of action

Like 1,25-dihydroxyergocalciferol, paricalcitol acts as an agonist at the vitamin D receptor and thereby lowers parathyroid hormone levels in the blood.

Pharmacokinetics
The plasma concentration of paricalcitol decreases rapidly and log-linearly within two hours after initial intravenous administration. Therefore, it is not expected to accumulate with multiple dosing, since paricalcitol is usually given no more frequently than every other day (3 times per week).

References 

Secosteroids
Vitamin D
AbbVie brands